Nothobranchius is a genus of small, freshwater killifish, classified in the family Nothobranchiidae in the order Cyprinodontiformes. There are about a hundred species in the genus, many with very small distributions. They are primarily native to East Africa from Sudan to northern South Africa, whereas a dozen species are found in the upper Congo River Basin; the greatest species richness is in Tanzania.

Nothobranchius typically inhabit ephemeral pools that are filled only during the monsoon season, and show extreme life-history adaptations to survive the dry season. When their habitats dry up, the adult fish die and the eggs survive encased in the clay during the dry season. The embryos survive the dry season by entering diapause, facilitated by their specialized eggs that have a very hard chorion and are resistant to desiccation and hypoxia. These species reach maturity very quickly once diapause is broken and have a very short life span; one species, Nothobranchius furzeri, reaches maturity in 17 days and seldom lives beyond 6 months.

Etymology
From Greek νοθοσ / nothos: false, spurious, and βράγχια / bránchia: gill.

Species

There are currently 96 recognized species in this genus:

 Nothobranchius albertinensis Nagy, Watters & Bellstedt, 2020
 Nothobranchius albimarginatus Watters, Wildekamp &  Cooper, 1998
 Nothobranchius angelae  Watters, Nagy & Bellstedt, 2019
 Nothobranchius annectens Watters, Wildekamp & Cooper, 1998
 Nothobranchius attenboroughi Nagy, Watters & Bellstedt, 2020
 Nothobranchius balamaensis Bragança & Chakona, 2022
 Nothobranchius bellemansi Valdesalici, 2014
 Nothobranchius bojiensis Wildekamp & Haas, 1992 (Boji Plains nothobranchius)
 Nothobranchius boklundi Valdesalici, 2010
 Nothobranchius brieni Poll, 1938
 Nothobranchius capriviensis Watters, Wildekamp & Shidlovskiy, 2015 (Caprivi nothobranchius)
 Nothobranchius cardinalis Watters, Cooper & Wildekamp, 2008 (Cardinal nothobranchius)
 Nothobranchius chochamandai Nagy, 2014
 Nothobranchius cooperi Nagy, Watters & Bellstedt, 2017
 Nothobranchius derhami Valdesalici & Amato, 2019
 Nothobranchius ditte  Nagy, 2018
 Nothobranchius eggersi Seegers, 1982
 Nothobranchius elongatus Wildekamp, 1982 (Elongate nothobranchius)
Nothobranchius elucens Nagy, 2021
 Nothobranchius fasciatus Wildekamp & Haas, 1992
 Nothobranchius flagrans Nagy, 2014 
 Nothobranchius flammicomantis Wildekamp, Watters & Sainthouse, 1998
 Nothobranchius foerschi Wildekamp & Berkenkamp, 1979
 Nothobranchius furzeri Jubb, 1971 (Turquoise killifish)
 Nothobranchius fuscotaeniatus Seegers, 1997
 Nothobranchius geminus Wildekamp, Watters & Sainthouse, 2002
 Nothobranchius guentheri (Pfeffer, 1893) (Red-tail nothobranchius)
 Nothobranchius hassoni Valdesalici & Wildekamp, 2004
 Nothobranchius hengstleri Valdesalici, 2007 
 Nothobranchius hoermanni Nagy, Watters & Bellstedt, 2020
 Nothobranchius insularis Costa, 2017
 Nothobranchius interruptus Wildekamp & Berkenkamp, 1979 (Kikambala nothobranchius)
 Nothobranchius itigiensis Nagy, Watters & Bellstedt, 2020
 Nothobranchius ivanovae Valdesalici, 2012
 Nothobranchius janpapi Wildekamp, 1977
 Nothobranchius jubbi Wildekamp & Berkenkamp, 1979
 Nothobranchius kadleci Reichard, 2010 
 Nothobranchius kafuensis Wildekamp & Rosenstock, 1989 (Kafue killifish)
 Nothobranchius kardashevi Valdesalici, 2012
 Nothobranchius kilomberoensis Wildekamp, Watters & Sainthouse, 2002
 Nothobranchius kirki Jubb, 1969 (Red-fin nothobranchius)
 Nothobranchius korthausae Meinken, 1973
 Nothobranchius krammeri Valdesalici & Hengstler, 2008
 Nothobranchius krysanovi Shidlovskiy, Watters & Wildekamp, 2010
 Nothobranchius kwalensis W. J. E. M. Costa, 2019
 Nothobranchius lourensi Wildekamp, 1977
 Nothobranchius lucius Wildekamp, Shidlovskiy & Watters, 2009
 Nothobranchius luekei Seegers, 1984
 Nothobranchius makondorum Wildekamp, Shidlovskiy & Watters, 2009
 Nothobranchius malaissei Wildekamp, 1978
 Nothobranchius matanduensis Watters, Nagy & Bellstedt, 2020
 Nothobranchius melanospilus (Pfeffer, 1896) (Black-spotted nothobranchius)
 Nothobranchius microlepis (Vinciguerra, 1897) (Small-scaled nothobranchius)
 Nothobranchius milvertzi Nagy, 2014
 Nothobranchius mkuziensis (Fowler, 1934)
 Nothobranchius moameensis Nagy, Watters & Bellstedt, 2020
 Nothobranchius neumanni (Hilgendorf, 1905)
 Nothobranchius niassa Valdesalici, Bills, Dorn, Reichwald & Cellerino, 2012
 Nothobranchius nikiforovi Nagy, Watters & Raspopova, 2021
 Nothobranchius nubaensis Valdesalici, Bellemans, Kardashev & Golubtsov, 2009
 Nothobranchius occultus Valdesalici, 2014
 Nothobranchius ocellatus (Seegers, 1985)
 Nothobranchius oestergaardi Valdesalici & Amato, 2011
 Nothobranchius orthonotus (Peters, 1844) (Spotted killifish)
 Nothobranchius ottoschmidti  Watters, Nagy & Bellstedt, 2019
 Nothobranchius palmqvisti (Lönnberg, 1907)
 Nothobranchius patrizii (Vinciguerra, 1927) (Blue nothobranchius)
 Nothobranchius pienaari Shidlovskiy, Watters & Wildekamp, 2010
 Nothobranchius polli Wildekamp, 1978
 Nothobranchius prognathus Costa, 2019
 Nothobranchius rachovii Ahl, 1926 (Blue-fin nothobranchius)
 Nothobranchius robustus Ahl, 1935 (Red victoria nothobranchius)
 Nothobranchius rosenstocki Valdesalici & Wildekamp, 2005
 Nothobranchius rubripinnis Seegers, 1986
 Nothobranchius rubroreticulatus Blache & Miton, 1960
 Nothobranchius rungwaensis  Watters, Nagy & Bellstedt, 2019
 Nothobranchius ruudwildekampi Costa, 2009
 Nothobranchius sagittae Wildekamp, Watters & Shidlovskiy, 2014
 Nothobranchius sainthousei Nagy, Cotterill & Bellstedt, 2016
 Nothobranchius seegersi Valdesalici & Kardashev, 2011
 Nothobranchius serengetiensis Wildekamp, Watters & Shidlovskiy, 2014
 Nothobranchius skeltoni  Watters, Nagy & Bellstedt, 2019
 Nothobranchius sonjae  Watters, Nagy & Bellstedt, 2019
 Nothobranchius steinforti Wildekamp, 1977
 Nothobranchius streltsovi Valdesalici (sv), 2016
 Nothobranchius symoensi Wildekamp, 1978
 Nothobranchius taeniopygus Hilgendorf, 1891 (Striped nothobranchius)
 Nothobranchius taiti Nagy, 2019
 Nothobranchius torgashevi Valdesalici, 2015
 Nothobranchius ugandensis Wildekamp, 1994 (Uganda nothobranchius)
 Nothobranchius usanguensis Wildekamp, Watters & Shidlovskiy, 2014
 Nothobranchius venustus Nagy, Watters & Bellstedt, 2020
 Nothobranchius virgatus Chambers, 1984
 Nothobranchius vosseleri Ahl, 1924 (Pangani nothobranchius)
 Nothobranchius wattersi Ng'oma, Valdesalici, Reichwald & Cellerino, 2013
 Nothobranchius willerti Wildekamp, 1992 (Mnanzini nothobranchius)

References

 
Nothobranchiidae
Freshwater fish genera
Taxa named by Wilhelm Peters